Chinese star maps (Chinese: s , t , xīngtú) are usually directional or graphical representations of Chinese astronomical alignments. Throughout the history of China, numerous star maps have been recorded. This page is intended to list or show the best available version of each star map. Star catalogs are also listed. For academic purposes, related star maps found in East Asia outside China are also listed.

List of star maps

See also
 Chinese constellations
 Traditional Chinese star names

References

External links

https://web.archive.org/web/20080117162040/http://www.lcsd.gov.hk/CE/Museum/Space/StarShine/HKSkyMap/e_starshine_hkskymap.htm

The Korean star map (Cheonsangyolchabunyajido 2308 x 3663) redrawn by Oh Gil-Sun on Astronote site
List of Japanese star charts from 17th–19th century and their storage locations. Also listed are some copies of Chinese star maps
Comparison of star charts found in ancient Chinese, Japanese and Korean tombs

Astronomy in China
Star atlases
Star maps

ko:동아시아의 별자리